There are over 20,000 Grade II* listed buildings in England.  This page is a list of these buildings in the district of Worcester in Worcestershire.

Worcester

|}

Notes

References 
English Heritage Images of England

External links

Worcester
 Worcester